Pine Point Research Natural Area is a natural area that is protected by the United States Department of Agriculture, specifically through the branch of the Forest Service. It is located in Cass County, Minnesota and is part of the Chippewa National Forest. The natural area is bounded on the north, east, and west sides by Lake Leech. To the south is Onigum, an unincorporated community that had been an Indian agency.

Ecology
Pine Point is a forested area that consists mostly of jack pine and red pine, as well as areas of meadow.

White-tailed deer (Odocoileus virginianus), black bear (Ursus americanus), snowshoe hare (Lepus americanus), and North American porcupine (Erethizon dorsatum) are common in the area.

Natural Landmark designation
The area has been designated a National Natural Landmark under the Historic Sites Act. It received this designation in 1980 from the United States Secretary of the Interior, giving it recognition as an outstanding example of the nation's natural history. The designation describes it as containing "undisturbed stands of red and mixed pine that have been protected for over 70 years. The site provides nesting habitat for the bald eagle and osprey".

Modern use
The natural area is open to the public but has no roads or marked trails. Research projects within Pine Point Research Natural Area must be approved by the United States Forest Service.

References

Protected areas of Cass County, Minnesota
Wilderness areas of Minnesota
National Natural Landmarks in Minnesota